Ronald Torbert is an American football official in the National Football League (NFL). He has been an official since the 2010 NFL season. He wears uniform number 62.

Early life 
Torbert graduated from Michigan State University and attended Harvard Law School earning a Juris doctor.

Career 
Torbert began his NFL officiating career in 2010 as a side judge before becoming a referee in the 2014 NFL season after Scott Green and Ron Winter announced they were retiring. Torbert is one of only eight African-American referees in NFL history, after Johnny Grier, Mike Carey, Jerome Boger, and Don Carey; he preceded Shawn Smith, Adrian Hill, and Tra Blake.

Torbert was the alternate referee for Super Bowl LIII. He is also featured in the NFL 100 year anniversary video which aired during that Super Bowl.

On January 25, 2022, Torbert was named the referee for Super Bowl LVI.

2022 crew 
 R: Ron Torbert
 U: Mark Pellis
 DJ: Max Causey
 LJ: Tim Podraza
 FJ: Ryan Dickson
 SJ: Keith Washington
 BJ: Tony Josselyn
 RO: Denise Crudup
 RA: Gerald Frye

Personal life 
Outside of his NFL officiating job, Torbert is an attorney, as is his fellow referee Clete Blakeman.

References

Living people
National Football League officials
Michigan State University alumni
African-American sports officials
Year of birth missing (living people)
Harvard Law School alumni
21st-century African-American people